Thomas Grant Delory Dickson-Peters (born 16 September 2002) is a Scottish professional footballer who plays for EFL League Two club Grimsby Town, on loan from Norwich City, as a striker.

Club career
After playing youth football with Norwich City, Dickson-Peters signed on loan for League One side Gillingham on 4 January 2022. Dickson-Peters made his debut for the Kent side on 8 January 2022 as a 45th minute substitute in a 4–0 loss to Ipswich Town.

The following week, while still out on loan, he signed a new long-term contract with Norwich City until the summer of 2025.

He signed for Grimsby Town on loan in January 2023.

International career
Dickson-Peters has represented Scotland at youth international level.

References

2002 births
Living people
Scottish footballers
Norwich City F.C. players
Gillingham F.C. players
Grimsby Town F.C. players
English Football League players
Association football forwards
Scotland youth international footballers
Scotland under-21 international footballers